Thérèse Delpech (11 February 1948 – 17 January 2012) was a French international relations expert and prolific public intellectual.
Thèrese Delpech graduated from the École Normale Supérieure and went on to pass the agrégation of philosophy. During the rest of her career she concentrated on international relations issues. Delpech had been director of strategic studies at the French Atomic Energy Commission (CEA) from 1997. She served as an adviser to Alain Juppé during his tenure as Prime Minister (1995–1997). She was also a researcher with CERI at Sciences Po, commissioner with the United Nations Monitoring, Verification and Inspection Commission, and international adviser to the International Committee of the Red Cross, and was "one of France's foremost thinkers on international security." Breaking with many French intellectuals she supported the 2003 American-led intervention in Iraq and had since advocated stronger sanctions against Iran.

She was ranked 81 in the Prospect Magazine 2008 Top 100 Public Intellectuals Poll. In 2012, RAND posthumously published what will perhaps be her last book, a detailed study of decades of RAND literature on nuclear deterrence.

Bibliography
Iran and the Bomb : The Abdication of International Responsibility  (Translator: Ros Schwartz) February 2009
Savage Century : Back to Barbarism   (Translator: George Holoch) September 2008
La Politica Del Caos June 2003

See also
Nuclear program of Iran
Politics of France

References

External links

Iran and the Bomb : The Abdication of International Responsibility review Foreign Affairs

CERI Sciences Po

Foreign policy writers
Nuclear program of Iran
Academic staff of Sciences Po
People from Versailles
1948 births
2012 deaths
21st-century French women writers
21st-century French non-fiction writers
Women political writers
Prix Femina essai winners